The Asia-Pacific Quiz Championships (AQC) is the premier team quiz event in the Asia-Pacific region.

History
  
The tournament began in 2012 as the ASEAN Quizzing Championships, an annual quiz competition held among quizzers from ASEAN, primarily those living in Malaysia, Singapore and the Philippines.  In 2015 the competition expanded to include participants from India and a number of off-site chapters and became the Asian Quizzing Championships (AQC). After teams from the wider Asia-Pacific region such as Australia (from 2017) and New Zealand (from 2018) began participating, the event was renamed the Asia-Pacific Quiz Championships to reflect this wider geographical participation.

The event was founded by Caleb Liu from Singapore and Movin Miranda from India (and a long time resident of Malaysia) with the goal of fostering friendly competition and growing interest in quizzing in the region.  The teams are selected by the National Quiz Associations of the respective member countries.

Format
Teams of four compete in three separate rounds, with the highest cumulative score being crowned champions.

Round 1 - Individual written round, modelled after the World Quizzing Championships.  Participants answer 200 questions worth 1 point each, with 25 questions drawn from each of eight categories: 
Culture
Entertainment
History
Lifestyle
Media
Science
Sport
World
The contribution to the overall team score which will be the cumulative total of the top three individual scores in each of the eight categories (with the lowest score for each category dropped). For example, if the four members of a team scored 15, 15, 15, 7 for Sport, the team score for Sport will be 45. Maximum score = 600 points.

Round 2 - Individual Response Round. Participants are asked questions individually in turn. They may answer themselves, or pass the question to a teammate. There is a maximum of three passes per player, once to each teammate. 40 questions (10 per team member), 4 points each. Maximum score = 160 points.
Round 3 - Team Discussion Round. Participants work as a team to answer 50 questions worth 5 points each. Maximum score = 250 points.

The maximum team score is therefore 1010 points though in practice teams do not approach that limit.

Participating Teams

Host City and Results

The current scoring format was adopted in 2017. Up to 2016 there were only 20 questions for each category in the written paper instead of 25. From 2017 onwards, 4 points were awarded in the Individual Response round instead of 5. From 2018 onwards, teams could be awarded half points (i.e. 2 points) in the team round alongside a full point score of 5 points.

Medal summary

Winning Teams

Highest Individual Scorers

While a team event, the AQC also acknowledges the highest scorers in the first (individual) round.

Records

 Largest Winning Margins
 India by 73 points (2017)
 Australia by 51 points (2018)
 Malaysia by 47 points (2012)
 India by 47 points (2022)
 Singapore by 41 points (2014)
 Narrowest Winning Margins
 Malaysia by 1 point (2016)
 Singapore by 11 points (2019)
 India by 11 points (2015)
 Singapore by 18 points  (2013)

Results last updated: 7 December 2022

References

External links 

Trivia competitions
Quiz games